The Sony Alpha 77 II (ILCA-77M2), stylized as the Sony α77 II, is an interchangeable-lens camera aimed at the advanced amateur. It replaced the Sony Alpha 77 model in June 2014. It is similar in design to its predecessor, including the use of a SLT transparent mirror and electronic viewfinder.

Specifications
The successor of Sony Alpha 77 model, the Sony Alpha 77 II is similar in design to its antecedent, including the use of a SLT transparent mirror and electronic viewfinder. It features a BIONZ X image processor and is compatible with A-mount lenses. GPS has been dropped in favour of Wi-Fi and NFC. The focus area is wider and denser, with a class-leading 79 AF points including 15 crossing sensor combined with subject tracking and eye-focus capabilities. The SLT design avoids the need to flip the mirror out of the way with every shot, allowing a rapid 12 fps burst speed for up to 60 frames in full resolution. Unlike most DSLR cameras, the phase-detect focus unit is operational during live-view and video (which is Full HD at 60p/50p and 24p/25p). The resolution of the camera is 24 megapixels. Sony's A-mount cameras feature in-body image stabilisation and the α77 II is the first of such to also stabilise the viewfinder when taking still images. ISO ranges from 50 to 25600. APS-C sized CMOS sensor.

AVCHD and MPEG-4 recording of full HD at 1920 x 1080 (1080i60 / 1080i50 @ 24M (Mode "FX"),
1080i60 / 1080i50 @ 17M (Mode "FH"),
1080p60 / 1080p50 @ 28M (Mode "PS"), 
1080p25 @ 24M (Mode "FX"),
1080p24 @ 24M (Mode "FX"),
1080p25 @ 17M (Mode "FH"),
1080p24 @ 17M (Mode "FH"),
1440×1080 @ 12M,
VGA @ 3M)

Reception
Angela Nicholson of TechRadar gave the camera four and a half stars, calling the unit "great" as a whole for enthusiasts wanting to shoot "a range of subjects in a wide variety of conditions." Callum McInerney-Riley of Amateur Photographer regarded the autofocus, graphical user interface and "comprehensive" wireless features as pros to the camera, but cited the harshness of the noise reduction and overexposure due to its translucent mirror, along with its lack of a GPS, as cons. Moritz Wanke of Chip gave it a rating of 93.8 percent, concluding it to be an improvement of its predecessor and the best camera containing an APS-C image sensor in the market. Writing for Zoom.nl, Cees de Jonge gave it a 7.9 out of 10, being surprised at its SLT designation, which he considered "passé".

Gallery

References
 General
 Sony UK: α77 II A-mount Camera with APS-C sensor
 Specific

Cameras introduced in 2014
77 II
Live-preview digital cameras